The Leeward Islands Football Association (LIFA) was formed in 1949.

Of the early tournaments only the winners are known; for the recent ones, the structure is largely unknown. It is also not known whether tournaments were staged in the missing years, though this is likely.

Finally, it is not always clear whether teams represent single islands or states (e.g. Saint Kitts/Nevis or Saint Christopher, Antigua/Barbuda or Antigua, etc.).

A new edition will be played in August 2014 with 8 teams.

The 2014 Leeward Islands Football Tournament, originally slated for August 9–17, has been postponed to a tentative date later this year.

Medalists

Men

International association football competitions in the Caribbean
1949 establishments in North America
Recurring sporting events established in 1949